An annular solar eclipse occurred on January 16, 1972. A solar eclipse occurs when the Moon passes between Earth and the Sun, thereby totally or partly obscuring the image of the Sun for a viewer on Earth. An annular solar eclipse occurs when the Moon's apparent diameter is smaller than the Sun's, blocking most of the Sun's light and causing the Sun to look like an annulus (ring). An annular eclipse appears as a partial eclipse over a region of the Earth thousands of kilometres wide.

The areas included were the whole of Antarctica, a part of the southernmost portion of South America much of it in Argentina and a smaller part of Chile, much of it in the region of Patagonia, also it included New Amsterdam and the southern islands of the Indian Ocean,.  The annular eclipse took place in western, southern and eastern Antarctica with its greatest eclipse in the eastcentral portion of the continent near the 75th parallel.   The eclipse's edges were in Réunion and Mauritius, the eclipse was close to the island of Madagascar.  The subsolar portion was in northcentral South West Africa (now Namibia).

Related eclipses

Eclipses in 1972
 An annular solar eclipse on Sunday, 16 January 1972.
 A total lunar eclipse on Sunday, 30 January 1972.
 A total solar eclipse on Monday, 10 July 1972.
 A partial lunar eclipse on Wednesday, 26 July 1972.

Solar eclipses of 1971–1974

Saros 121

Metonic series

Notes

References

1972 1 16
1972 in science
1972 1 16
January 1972 events